Knowltonia may refer to:
 Knowltonia (beetle), a genus of beetle in the family Buprestidae
 Knowltonia (plant), a genus of plant in the family Ranunculaceae